Cide Palace or Temple may refer to:

 Cide Palace, a temple of Mazu in Zuoying District, Kaohsiung, Taiwan
 Cide Palace in Siaogang District, Kaohsiung, Taiwan
 Cide Palace, Rinan Village in Dajia District, Taichung, Taiwan
 Cide Palace, Lugang, Taiwan

zh:慈德宮